Florida Department of Revenue is a state agency of Florida concerned with taxes. It is headquartered in Tallahassee.

References

External links
 Florida Department of Revenue

State agencies of Florida
US state tax agencies